"A few acres of snow" (in the original French, "", with "") is one of several quotations from Voltaire, an 18th-century writer. They are representative of his sneering evaluation of Canada as lacking economic value and strategic importance to 18th-century France.

In Voltaire's time, Canada was the name of a territory of New France that covered most of modern-day southern Quebec. However, "Canada" was also commonly used as a generic term to cover all of New France, including the whole of the Louisiana territory, as well as modern-day southern Ontario, Labrador, New Brunswick, and Prince Edward Island. The meaning of "Canada" that Voltaire intended is a matter of some dispute.

The exact phrase "" first appears in 1759 in chapter 23 of Voltaire's book Candide, but the phrase "a few acres of ice" appeared in a letter he wrote in 1757. Voltaire wrote similar sarcastic remarks in other works.

Background
In Voltaire's day, New France included Canada, Acadia, Louisiana, and other territories. All of those colonies were the object of Voltaire's sarcastic comments at one point or another.

Through all his writings on the subject, Voltaire's basic idea about France's Canadian colony always remained the same. It can be summarized as comprising an economic premise and a strategic premise, both of which concur to a practical conclusion, as follows:

 Almost the entirety of Canada's territory is and will remain an unproductive and useless frozen wasteland.
 Great Britain, having establishing colonies on the more productive territories to the south and to the east (the Thirteen Colonies), and provided them with a much larger population, will not tolerate the presence of another European power in that area and will relentlessly attack Canada until such presence is ousted. Given the enormous disproportion in population and material resources between the French and British colonies in North America, the impossibility of modifying that imbalance in the foreseeable future and Britain's generally-better control of the maritime routes to Europe, Britain will inevitably prevail sooner or later.
 Therefore, an effective defence of Canada by France requires an extraordinarily large commitment of resources in comparison to the scant economic value in return, and any resources thus expended, even if they allowed victories in the short term, are wasted as they can serve at best only to postpone for a few more decades the handing over of Canada to Britain, which is inevitable in the long term. Consequently, sound economic policy dictates handing over Canada to Britain as soon as possible and concentrating France's resources in its West Indian colonies, which are more valuable economically and more readily defensible.

The year 1758 included the Battle of Fort Frontenac (August 26–28, a French defeat) and French naval secretary 's October refusal to provide  with much-needed reinforcements to defend Quebec City. According to Berryer, "we don't try to save the stables when the fire is at the house" (infamously). The British siege of Québec City ended in a French defeat in the Battle of the Plains of Abraham in September 1759, and Montréal surrendered the next year.

Today's critics of Voltaire's opinion are directed primarily at his economic assessment of the Canadian colony. Voltaire's idea of the Canadian colony based essentially on fur trade was even during his own writings already outdated by almost a century. Thus, although it may be difficult to determine exactly what part of his depiction of Canada might be attributed to deliberate exaggeration for polemical purposes, attachment to a preconceived idea, or mere misinformation, his few writings on the subject seem to display a certain level of short-sightedness regarding the actual level of economic evolution that had already been reached in the settled parts of Canada and about the colony's potential for further development.

On the other hand, Voltaire's assessment of the heavy financial burden required for France's military defence of Canada and of the practical impossibility of such defence in the long term remains valid. Consequently, if he had espoused a more favourable idea of the economic potential of the colony, it would likely not have changed his general conclusion.

Voltaire's famous quotations about New France were for the most part written between 1753 and 1763, shortly before and then during the Seven Years' War. Voltaire was living in Switzerland during most of that period. During the war, he sometimes appeared to favor King Frederick II of Prussia, who was allied with Britain against France. They maintained a regular personal correspondence during the war and were on better terms again after their quarrel of 1753.

Voltaire was also then in correspondence with some French ministers. He thus corresponded with both sides of the belligerents in the war although mostly on personal and literary levels, rather than a political level. Thinking that the war was a mistake for France, he used several opportunities to ask the French ministers to simply quit the war. Boundary disputes in their American colonies had been an early  between Britain and France in 1754 in the war, which was in 1756 further complicated by purely-European considerations and ended in 1763. Voltaire's position that France should let go of its North American colonies was in accord with his position about the war in general. For Voltaire, handing over New France would appease Britain. His position about the European war likely increased his tendency to paint New France as being of little value.

Quotations in their textual context
These quotations are presented in chronological order.

1753 — 
Chapter 151 — Of the possessions of the French in America:

1756 — Letter to 

1757 — Letter to Mr 
Also of note is the clear preposition of location "in Canada." The relevant passage of the letter reads as follows:

The sentence from Voltaire's letter to Moncrif has been quoted often. The 19th-century writer Jules Verne (1828–1905) quoted it in his novel A Family without a name, published in 1889, which was set in the Canada of 1837 during the Lower Canada Rebellion. The famous sentence is quoted in Chapter 1 of the novel, which has likely contributed to the quotation's popularity.

1758 — 
Voltaire used his "few acres of ice" phrase again the following year, slightly modified, in his novel  (written in 1758 and published in 1759) although "ice" was now replaced by "snow". The "snow" version of 1758 has generally become better known today in Canada than the "ice" version of 1757, perhaps because  is sometimes used in high school courses.

In the original French version, Voltaire uses the phrase "," and the preposition "" did not have the usual meaning that it now has in French. Instead, "" was commonly used by Voltaire in his writings to express a general meaning of vagueness about an area in the general sense of "somewhere in or around the general area." It is apparent from the whole of his writings that he viewed or pretended to view, Canada as a vast icy and snowy area. Thus, it is immaterial to ponder if by "a few acres" Voltaire had in mind one of the areas in dispute in 1754, such as the Ohio Valley (in itself hardly an insignificant patch of land) or the Acadian border. By 1758, the war had extended to all possessions of the belligerents. Under Voltaire's pen, the term is deliberately vague, and the point of using it is to convey the idea that any acres of land in the general area of Canada are so unimportant that even their location is not worth worrying about.

1760 — Letter from 

1760 — Letter to the 

1762 — Letter to 
A short letter, it can be quoted in full:

1763 — 
The  was written by Voltaire over several years. These relevant passages were likely written in or after 1763.

1763 — Letter to 

Modern usage
The phrase continues to be referenced in the modern era.

 is the title of a 1972 movie by Denis Héroux, also known by the English title The Rebels.

In the 1980s, the marketers of the Quebec edition of the game Trivial Pursuit punningly named their product "" (A few acres of traps).

The name of the board game A Few Acres of Snow is derived from this phrase. Designed by Martin Wallace, it is about the French and British conflict over what is now Canada.

Notes

References

External links
A few examples of quotations of Voltaire's writings about Canada in the Canadian media:
 Quartier Libre
 Robert Leckie, A Few Acres of Snow: The Saga of the French and Indian Wars. Wiley, 2000, .
 The People of New France by Allan Greer

New France
Canadian political phrases
Acadian history
Canadian identity
Candide